STMC may refer to:

Sha Tin Methodist College, a government subsidized secondary school, sponsored by the Methodist Church in Hong Kong
South Texas Medical Center, a medical research and educational center in South Texas
St. Thomas More Collegiate, a high school located in Burnaby, British Columbia, Canada
Standseilbahn St. Moritz–Corviglia, a funicular railway in the Swiss canton of Graubunden